Miikka Turunen (born 18 August 1979) is a Finnish football player currently playing for KuPS.

References
Guardian Football
KuPS

External links 

Living people
Kuopion Palloseura players
Finnish footballers
Veikkausliiga players
1979 births
Association football midfielders
People from Varkaus
Sportspeople from North Savo